The Pretender: Island of the Haunted is an American made-for-television action-drama film and the second and final of The Pretender franchise of movies starring Michael T. Weiss as a professor searching for a mysterious artifact. The television film was released on American cable channel TNT on December 10, 2001.

Plot
The film begins with Jarod working as a professor and searching for a mysterious artifact.  Both he and Ms. Parker received e-mails containing a photograph of their mothers standing side by side at the end of the previous film, and it is revealed that the artifact Jarod is searching for appears in the photograph, engraved on a wall behind the two women.  Jarod's search leads him to a shopkeeper who shows Jarod a small hidden compartment below his store, where the picture of his mother and Mrs. Parker was apparently taken. The shopkeeper believes the shop to be haunted, as occult worship once took place there, and tells Jarod that the engraving on the wall is evidence of this. Meanwhile, Ms. Parker visits the store and leaves with a small doll, then returns to the centre, where she shows the doll to Angelo. Angelo goes into a fit, drawing a perfect picture of the engraving, and then draws a picture of an old monastery, calling it an "Evil Place" and chanting 'Evil People, Evil Place' repeatedly. The monastery is on the Isle of the Haunted, where Jarod has gone to find his mother. Ms. Parker follows.

A hunt begins for a set of scrolls containing prophecies on the Isle of Carthis. Jarod (Michael T. Weiss) and Ms. Parker (Andrea Parker) form an uneasy alliance in order to learn the history behind The centre.  While tracing her lineage, Ms. Parker discovers that her supposed father, Mr. Parker (Harve Presnell), is actually her uncle, and that she is actually the daughter of William Raines (Richard Marcus).  The centre's original founder, Ms. Parker's ancestor, is revealed to have once resided on Carthis.  In light of these discoveries, Ms. Parker's allegiance starts to waver.  She turns Jarod over to the Centre authorities once they reach the mainland, but later confronts her "father", Jarod, Raines, and Lyle (James Denton) on board their plane. When Jarod goads Mr. Parker into looking at the text of the scrolls, Parker is stunned by what he reads. He grabs the scrolls, then parachutes out of the plane, apparently to his death.

On Raines' orders, Lyle murders the plane's pilot and co-pilot, but the plane's electronics are shorted out by Mr. Parker's exit.  Jarod convinces Lyle and Raines to release him so he can safely land the plane using his aircraft knowledge while Miss Parker and Lyle try to re-connect the electronics before the plane crashes.  They succeed, and during the crash-landing Jarod escapes.  With Mr. Parker seemingly dead, Mr. Raines assumes control of the centre, and the chase between Jarod and Ms. Parker resumes.  In addition, Lyle begins working independently to capture Jarod, and Raines makes it clear that Ms. Parker will face severe consequences if she fails to bring Jarod in first.  During one of Jarod and Ms. Parker's infrequent phone conversations, Ms. Parker expresses sympathy for Jarod and his mission, but sadly warns that she will continue to try and capture him.

The story ends with the coveted scrolls washing up on a deserted beach. Their text seems to prophesy both the formation of the centre and the appearance of a Chosen One ... "a boy named Jarod."

Cast 
 Michael T. Weiss as Jarod 
 Andrea Parker as Miss Parker 
 Patrick Bauchau as Sydney 
 Jon Gries as Broots 
 Harve Presnell as Mr. Parker 
 Richard Marcus as William Raines 
 James Denton as Mr. Lyle
 Paul Dillon as Angelo 
 Diana Leblanc as Ocee 
 John Bourgeois as Brother Menenicus 
 Jack Langedijk as Brother Rinaldus 
 Julian Richings as Brother Clote 
 Dean McKenzie as A Triumvirate Sweeper 
 Chloe Randle-Reis as Cryptkeeper's Daughter (as Chloe Randle Reis) 
 Sam Ayers as Sam the Sweeper (uncredited) 
 Glenn Bang as Mr. Parker's Doctor (uncredited) 
 Neil Crone as Owner, The Alley Sports Bar (uncredited) 
 Kim Myers as Jarod's mother (uncredited) 
 Frank McAnulty as Brother Theo (uncredited) 
 Conrad Coates as Adama (uncredited)

External links 
 
 

2001 television films
2001 films
TNT Network original films
Television series reunion films
2007 films